Hun Hunahpu (pronounced ), or 'Head-Apu I' (a calendrical name) is a figure in Mayan mythology. According to Popol Vuh he was the father of the Maya Hero Twins, Head-Apu and Xbalanque. As their shared calendrical day name suggests, Head-Apu I was the father of Head-Apu. He is believed to be the father of the twins' half-brothers and the patrons of artisans and writers, Hun-Chowen and Hun-Batz. Head-Apu I is paired with his brother, Vucub-Hunahpu, Head-Apu VII. The brothers were tricked in the Dark House by the lords of the Underworld (Xibalba) and sacrificed. Head-Apu I's head was suspended in a trophy tree and changed to a calabash. Its saliva (i.e., the juice of the calabash) impregnated Xquic, a daughter of one of the lords of Xibalba. She fled the Underworld and conceived the Twins. After defeating the Underworld lords, the twins recovered the remains of their father and their father's brother, but could not resuscitate them.

Head-Apu I and the Maize deity 
It has been asserted that the Mayas of the Classical Period took a more optimistic view and believed the sad paternal figure to have been reborn as maize. In this theory, the scene of the Tonsured Maize God rising from a turtle carapace (the 'tomb' of the earth) is interpreted as Head-Apu I resurrected. The flanking Hero Twins assisting him are accordingly taken to be his sons. Head-Apu I is thus often referred to as a 'maize deity,' and the maize deity is commonly referred to as a 'first father'. In support of the Maize Deity theory, reference is often made to a pottery scene showing a cacao tree assimilated to the Tonsured Maize God. It has a trophy head suspended among its branches. The trophy head is taken to be that of Head-Apu I while the head of the Tonsured Maize God is its transformation.

The identification of Head-Apu I with the Classic Mayan Maize Deity has become popular, but requires further corroboration. The hieroglyphic name of the Tonsured Maize God (although including the prefix 'One') is not recognizable as that of Head-Apu I. Moreover, the tree with the suspended trophy head is a personified cacao tree, rather than a calabash tree, as in Popol Vuh.

Recent Discoveries 
In June 2022, archaeologists from the Mexico's National Institute of Anthropology and History (INAH) announced the discovery of a 1,300-year-old nine-inch-tall plaster head statue indicating Hun Hunahpu. The figure's semi-shaved haircut that resembles ripe corn gives reason to the possibility that it is a young maize god. Researchers assume that the Mayan inhabitants of Palenque possibly placed a large stone statuette over a pond to represent the entrance to the underworld. According to archaeologist Arnoldo González Cruz, the Mayan people symbolically shuttered the pool by breaking up some of the plaster and filling it with animal remains, including pottery fragments, carved bone remains, shells, obsidian arrowheads, beads, vegetables, and others.

See also 

 2022 in archaeology
 Archaeology of the Americas

References

Sources 
 Dennis Tedlock, Popol Vuh. New York: Simon and Schuster 1986.
 Karl Taube, Aztec and Maya Myths. The British Museum / University of Texas Press 1997.
  

Characters from the Popol Vuh
Maya mythology and religion
Maya deities